Tom Pischke (born May 4, 1982) is an American politician who has served in the South Dakota House of Representatives from the 25th district since 2017.

Election history

References

1982 births
Living people
Republican Party members of the South Dakota House of Representatives
21st-century American politicians